Any Number Can Win is an album by the American jazz organist Jimmy Smith, arranged by Billy Byers and Claus Ogerman.

On the Billboard albums chart, Any Number Can Win peaked at number 25, and the single of Smith's "(Theme From) Any Number Can Win" peaked at 96 on both the Billboard Hot 100 and on the Hot R&B Sides chart.

Track listing
 "You Came a Long Way from St. Louis" (John Benson Brooks, Bob Russell) – 4:21
 "The Ape Woman" (Lalo Schifrin) – 3:21
 "Georgia on My Mind" (Hoagy Carmichael, Stuart Gorrell) – 2:28
 "G'won Train" (Patti Bown) – 4:21
 "(Theme From) Any Number Can Win" (Michel Magne) – 2:10
 "What'd I Say" (Ray Charles) – 2:51
 "The Sermon" (Jimmy Smith) – 7:40
 "Ruby" (Mitchell Parish, Heinz Roemheld) – 2:20
 "Tubs" (Smith) – 2:48
 "Blues for C.A." (Smith) – 3:43 Dedicated to Clarence Avant

Personnel

Musicians

 Jimmy Smith – Hammond organ
 Bob Bushnell – bass guitar (tracks 2, 5, 10)
 Art Davis – double bass (tracks 1-2, 4, 9-10) 
 George Duvivier – double bass (tracks 6-7)
 Milt Hinton  – double bass (tracks 3, 8)
 Ed Shaughnessy – drums (tracks 1-2, 4, 9-10)
 Doug Allen – drums (tracks 3, 5, 7)
 Mel Lewis – drums (tracks 6-7)
 Billy Mure – guitar (tracks 3, 5, 7)
 Kenny Burrell – guitar (tracks 3, 5-8)
 Vince Gambella – guitar (tracks 3, 5, 7)
 George Devens – percussion (tracks 1-2, 4, 9-10) 
 Jimmy Cleveland, Melba Liston, Paul Faulise – trombone (tracks 1-2, 4, 9-10) 
 Charlie Shavers – trumpet (tracks 1-2, 4)
 Snooky Young – trumpet (tracks 2, 10)
 Jimmy Maxwell – trumpet (tracks 1-2, 4, 9-10)
 Joe Newman – trumpet (tracks 1-2, 4-5 9-10)
 James Sedlar – trumpet (track 5)
 Budd Johnson – woodwind (tracks 1-2, 4-5 9-10)
 Jerome Richardson – woodwind (track 5)
 Jerry Dodgion, Marvin Halladay, Phil Woods, Seldon Powell – woodwinds (tracks 1-2, 4, 9-10)

Technical
 Creed Taylor – producer
 Billy Byers – arranger (tracks 2, 4, 10)
 Claus Ogerman – arranger (tracks 1, 9), conductor (tracks 1-2, 4, 9-10)
 Richard Seidel – reissue production
 Rudy Van Gelder, Phil Macy, Phil Ramone - recording engineers
 Val Valentin - director of engineering

Chart performance

Album

Single

References

External links
Any Number Can Win at The Incredible Jimmy Smith site

1963 albums
Jimmy Smith (musician) albums
Albums arranged by Billy Byers
Albums arranged by Claus Ogerman
Albums conducted by Claus Ogerman
Albums produced by Creed Taylor
Albums recorded at Van Gelder Studio
Verve Records albums